Scalpay is an inhabited island in the Inner Hebrides of Scotland which has a population of 4.

Geology 
The bedrock of Scalpay is largely the  Neoproterozoic age sandstone and conglomerates of the Sithean Glac an Ime Member of the Applecross Formation and in the west, the Mullach nan Carn members of the Diabaig Formation, a unit of the Torridon Group, or informally the Torridonian sandstone.
Outcrops of hornfelsed basalt of the Palaeocene age  Skye Lava Group and the Palaeogene age Scalpay granite are found in the south and west of Scalpay.
The Scalpay Sandstone and Pabay Shale formations found in the southeast of the island around Scalpay House are assigned to the Lias Group.
Quaternary deposits are represented by peat in the north, present day marine deposits and raised marine deposits along the southwestern shore and a restricted area of glacial till in the interior.

Geography
It has an area of just under . The island had a population of ten usual residents in 2001 and of four in 2011.

Scalpay is privately owned and operates a red deer farm, shooting estate and holiday cottages.  Much of Scalpay is covered with heather, while other areas are conifer forestry plantations.

Etymology
Mac an Tàilleir (2003) suggests the name derives from "ship island" from the Norse. However, Haswell-Smith states that the Old Norse name was Skalprøy, meaning "scallop island".

Prehistory and Archaeology 
Between 1999 and 2004 a large scale archaeological project, Scotland's First Settlers, was undertaken in the Inner Sound to locate and examine sites relating to the Mesolithic period in the strait. The entire coastline of the Inner Sound together with its islands was walked by volunteers and archaeologists. On Scalpay they found 9 lithic scatters. All of these sites  were prehistoric but only three of the sites contained microliths, which confirms them as Mesolithic.

History

Dean Monro gave the following description of Scalpay in 1549:...a fair hunting forest, full of deer, with certain little woods and small towns, well inhabited and manured, with many strong coves, good for fishing, in heritage it pertains to Maclean of Duart.

By the time of Dr Johnson's tour, the island was held by a tenant of Sir Alexander Macdonald.

Shipping magnate and politician, Donald Currie owned the island in the late 19th century and was responsible for the construction of the first roads and much tree planting.

See also

 List of islands of Scotland

Footnotes

References
 
 Johnson, Samuel A Journey to the Western Islands of Scotland. London. Strachan and Cadell, 1785 (new edition).

External links
Local website

Skye and Lochalsh
Islands of Highland (council area)
Islands of the Inner Hebrides